The Militarized Communist Party of Peru (MPCP; formerly known as SL-Proseguir) is a militant group in Peru that follows Marxism–Leninism–Maoism and participates in the communist insurgency in Peru. It is considered a terrorist organization by the government of Peru. The MPCP operates primarily in the VRAEM area and is involved in the area's coca production. Comrade José has been the leader of MPCP since its creation in 2018 after its split from the declining Shining Path guerilla group.

The MPCP is considered the direct successor to the Shining Path by the government of Peru and other international entities, because most of its members splintered from the Shining Path in 1992. Ideologically, the group brands itself as a Maoist organization, although it is very different from Shining Path. The MPCP has been influenced by Andean ethnic and ultranationalist beliefs from former members of the Peruvian Armed Forces, and has moved away from the anti-religious stance of SL. In 2018, the MPCP formed an alliance with the Ethnocacerist movement, called the United Democratic Andean Revolutionary Front of Peru (.

The MPCP has stated that it has severed its ties with the leader of the Shining Path, Abimael Guzmán, after his capture in 1992 and subsequent call for peace in 1993. However, the MPCP itself has been accused of human rights violations, including slavery of indigenous peoples, recruitment of children for use as child soldiers, and terrorist attacks against civilians and members of the Peruvian government, including the San Miguel del Ene attack on 23 May 2021, killing 18 people in the Satipo Province of Peru.

Explanatory notes

References

2018 establishments in Peru
Anti-revisionist organizations
Communist militant groups
Communist parties in Peru
Guerrilla movements in Latin America
Internal conflict in Peru
Maoist parties
Political parties established in 2018
Political parties in Peru
Rebel groups in Peru
Shining Path